The Cry of the Onlies is a 1989 science fiction novel by American writer Judy Klass, part of the Star Trek: The Original Series saga.

Plot
Boaco Six is caught up in revolution and Captain Kirk is sent in to re-establish diplomatic ties. His efforts are going well until an experimental Federation ship destroys a Boacan vessel. In order to stop a war, Kirk attempts to track down and uncover the secrets of the Federation ship.

External links

Novels based on Star Trek: The Original Series
1989 American novels
American science fiction novels